Graciano is a Spanish red wine grape that is grown primarily in Rioja.

It may also refer to:

People with the name
Graciano Antuña (1903–1937), Spanish union socialist politician
Graciano Brito (born 1985), Cape Verdean footballer
Graciano Atienza Fernández (1884–1935), Spanish journalist, lawyer and politician
Graciano Fonseca (born 1974), Colombian road racing cyclist
Graciano Ricalde Gamboa (1873–1942), Mexican mathematician
Graciano García García (born 1939), Spanish journalist
Graciano Junior Gonçalves (born 1993), Brazilian footballer
Graciano López Jaena (1856–1896), Filipino national hero
Graciano Nepomuceno (1881–1974), Filipino sculptor and woodcarver
Graciano dos Santos Neves (1868–1922), Brazilian physician and politician
Graciano Rocchigiani (1963–2018), German boxer
Clóvis Graciano (1907–1988), Brazilian artist
Eduardo Graciano (born 1967), Mexican cyclist
Fernando Torres Graciano (born 1970), Mexican politician

See also
Graciano San Francisco, a Honduran football club based in Gracias
Soledad de Graciano Sánchez, the second-largest city of the state of San Luis Potosí in Mexico

Masculine given names
Portuguese masculine given names
Spanish masculine given names
Portuguese-language surnames
Spanish-language surnames